Chettinad Group is an Indian business conglomerate headquartered in Chennai. It was founded as the Annaamalai Chettiar Group by Annamalai Chettiar.

Companies 

 Chettinad Cement Corporation Limited
 Chettinad Power Corporation Private Limited
 Chettinad Quartz Products Private Limited
 Chettinad MB-F Hi Silica Limited
 Chettinad Logistics Private Limited
 Chettinad International Coal Terminal Private Limited
 Chettinad Lignite Transport Services Private Limited 
 Chettinad Plantations Private Limited
 South India Corporation Limited
 Chettinad University
 Chettinad Medical College and Hospital
 Chettinad Dental College and Research Institute
 Chettinad super speciality hospital
 Chettinad hospital and research institute hospital

References

Companies based in Chennai
Privately held companies of India
Conglomerate companies of India
1912 establishments in India